Ellychnia californica, known generally as the California glowworm or western firefly, is a species of firefly in the beetle family Lampyridae. It is found in North America.

References

Further reading

 
 

Lampyridae
Articles created by Qbugbot
Beetles described in 1854